Club de Yates de Acapulco is a yacht club located in Acapulco, Mexico. Opened in December 1955, it served as host of the sailing events for the 1968 Summer Olympics in Mexico City.

Since the 1968 Games, the yacht club continues to serve as a sailing venue.

References
1968 Summer Olympics official report. Volume 2. Part 1. p. 76. 
Official website history.

External links
Official website

Venues of the 1968 Summer Olympics
Olympic sailing venues
Sports venues in Mexico
Yacht clubs in Mexico
Sports venues in Guerrero
1955 establishments in Mexico
Sports venues completed in 1955